Üle rahutu vee is a novel by Estonian author August Gailit. It was first published in 1951.

Estonian novels
1951 novels